The women's 200 metre freestyle S14 event at the 2022 Commonwealth Games was held on 3 August at the Sandwell Aquatics Centre.

Schedule
The schedule is as follows:

All times are British Summer Time (UTC+1)

Results

Final

References

Women's 200 metre freestyle S14